The Academy of Finance (AOF) is an American educational program first established in 1982 by the National Academy Foundation.   It offers high school students an opportunity to study accounting, international trade, leadership, and the use of technology in preparing for college and the financial services industry.  

NAF was created by Phyllis Frankfort, the Director of the Academy of Finance, in 1989. In 1981, she designed a program for the New York City Department of Education and for Shearson Lehman Brothers chaired by Sanford I. Weill. Her proposal for the "Institute for the Study of Finance" recommended a program for public high school students. Weill gave $100,000 to develop the program through Lehman Brothers' foundation, headed by D. Topol, which was matched by the New York City Board of Education. Frankfort designed and implemented the program and the first Academy of Finance opened at John Dewey High School in Brooklyn in 1982 with 35 students and grew to more than two hundred in 1984. 

The program, which subsequently grew to be nationwide, was designed to introduce young people in New York City to potential careers in the financial services industry.

References

External links
 

United States educational programs
Educational organizations based in the United States